was a Japanese samurai warrior of the Sengoku period and Edo period.

Family
 Father: Saji Nobukata
 Mother: Oinu, sister of Oda Nobunaga
 Wives: 
 Oeyo (m.1583, div.1592)
 Oushin daughter of Oda Nobunaga
 Children:
 Kitahime
 Nuihime
 Saji Tamenari

Career
He was warden of a castle in a province under the control of Toyotomi Hideyoshi. Hideyoshi caused Kazunari to marry Oeyo, the sister of a favorite concubine.  When Kazunari's support for Tokugawa Ieyasu became known, Hideyoshi took back the woman. She later married Ieyasu's son Tokugawa Hidetada and mothered the shōgun Tokugawa Iemitsu.

In popular culture
Saji is played by Takehiro Hira in the NHK Taiga drama ''Gō (2011).

References

Samurai
1569 births
1634 deaths
Oda retainers